Basingstoke and Deane is a local government district and borough in Hampshire, England. Its primary settlement is Basingstoke.

It is the northernmost borough of Hampshire, bordered by Berkshire to the north.

The first Basingstoke Mayor, George Baynard, was appointed in 1641. The district was formed as the District of Basingstoke on 1 April 1974 by the merger of the borough of Basingstoke, Basingstoke Rural District and Kingsclere and Whitchurch Rural District. On 20 January 1978, following the grant of borough status, the district became the Borough of Basingstoke and Deane.  The council claims that the new title included the names of the largest town and smallest village in the borough, although there are eight civil parishes with populations smaller than Deane.

Basingstoke and Deane has over 430 local neighbourhood watch schemes in the area.

Governance

Elections to the borough council are held in three out of every four years, with one third of the 60 seats on the council being elected at each election. Since the first election in 1973, the council has either been controlled by the Conservative Party or under no overall control. Most recently the Conservatives have formed the administration on the council since the 2006 election and had a majority since the 2008 election. Following the 2012 election a Conservative Party councillor defected to independent, and one to UKIP. - In the 2021 Local Elections the Conservatives made four gains. In December 2022 three Conservatives and one Labour Councillor resigned from their respective groups and the council is now composed of the following councillors:

Since 2004 the Borough has had a youth council named "Basingstoke and Deane Youth Council", although formerly known as "Youth of Basingstoke and Deane".

Wards
, Basingstoke and Deane consists of 29 wards:

 Basing
 Baughurst and Tadley North
 Bramley and Sherfield
 Brighton Hill North
 Brighton Hill South
 Brookvale and Kings Furlong
 Buckskin
 Burghclere, Highclere and St Mary Bourne
 Chineham
 East Woodhay
 Eastrop
 Grove
 Hatch Warren and Beggarwood
 Kempshott
 Kingsclere
 Norden
 Oakley and North Waltham
 Overton, Laverstoke and Steventon
 Pamber and Silchester
 Popley East
 Popley West
 Rooksdown
 Sherborne St John
 South Ham
 Tadley Central
 Tadley South
 Upton Grey and The Candovers
 Whitchurch
 Winklebury

References

 
Non-metropolitan districts of Hampshire
Boroughs in England